Pouteria sandwicensis is a species of flowering tree in the sapodilla family, Sapotaceae, that is endemic to the main islands of Hawaii.  Names for this species in the Hawaiian language include Ālaa, Āulu and Ēlaa.

Description

The thick bark is grey and fissured, with an orange inner layer. The upper surfaces of the leaves are glabrous and shiny green, while the lower surfaces are dull and may feature bronze or reddish brown pressed hairs. The hairs are sometimes found only on the tips of new leaves (see photo gallery below). Inflorescences with one to four bell-shaped flowers are found at the bases of leaves.

Uses
The wood of ālaa is yellow with black streaks, extremely hard, and close grained. Native Hawaiians used it in house construction and to make the pale (gunwales) of waa (outrigger canoes), ōō (digging sticks), and ihe (spears). The sticky, milky sap was used as a kolū (glue) for weapon and tool handles and as kēpau (birdlime), much like papala kepau (Pisonia spp.).

References

External links

 Star Bulletin In The Garden 20090403
 Bishop Museum Ethnobotany database

sandwicensis
Endemic flora of Hawaii
Trees of Hawaii
Flora without expected TNC conservation status